Who Really Cares may refer to:

 Who Really Cares: The Surprising Truth About Compassionate Conservatism by Arthur C. Brooks
 "Who Really Cares (Featuring the Sound of Insanity)", a song by Powderfinger
 Who Really Cares (album) by Janis Ian
 Who Really Cares, a 2016 album by TV Girl
 "Hey, Who Really Cares?", a song by the Whispers from the album The Whispers' Love Story
 "Hey, Who Really Cares?", a song by Linda Perhacs from the album Parallelograms